Park Eun-hye (born November 7, 1982), better known by the stage name Ivy (Hangul: 아이비), is a South Korean singer and musical actress.

Career

2005: Debut 
A former JYPE trainee, Ivy first appeared in Lee Soo Young's music video "Holding onto the Flowers" in 2005. She officially debuted as a singer in 2005 with the single "What Happened Tonight". Her official second single "A ha" was an uptempo R&B single whose dance routine was famously parodied by Park Kyung-lim on X-Man. Around the same time, Ivy also promoted "I Am a Fool", a ballad, which was performed in conjunction with "A ha". The album placed 48th for the year. Although inactive for most of 2006, she has collaborated with Shinhwa for their album State of the Art on the track "Highway Star".

2007–2008: Breakthrough, controversy and hiatus 

On February 12, 2007, Ivy's second album, Vol. 2 – A Sweet Moment, was released, with the lead single "Sonata of Temptation", which sampled Beethoven's Fur Elise, performing very well on the charts. Due to the song's popularity, she received the 2007 M.net KM Music Festival award for Best Female Solo Artist. Despite its success, the song's music video caused controversy, as it recreated a fight scene between Tifa Lockhart and Loz from Final Fantasy VII Advent Children, without proper permission (the disclaimer appearing on the video did not satisfy the rights to use it). In April, the Seoul Central District Court banned the music video from being shown on television, stating that "Most of the clip is noticeably similar to scenes from the film". The story has received coverage on gaming blogs internationally, including Kotaku, which noted that the director has stated that he was unable to find the contact info for Square Enix.

On June 23, 2007, Ivy performed at American singer Christina Aguilera's Seoul concert as part of her Back to Basics Tour. Aguilera reportedly viewed video clips sent in by South Korean artists, as she wanted to choose the best. The artists were viewed for their dancing and singing abilities, as well as album sales. She performed as the opening act for the first concert on the first day, while Lee Min-woo of Shinhwa performed the following day.

In 2008, under the pseudonym "The Lighthouse", she wrote the lyrics for "Dear Mom..." for Girls' Generation's mini-album Gee, and "마지막 선물" ("Last Gift") for Shinee's first album The Shinee World. The songs were composed by her boyfriend Kim Tae-Sung.

Ivy had a supporting role in the joint South Korean-Japanese 2008 mini-drama series "Tokyo Sun Showers" as Eun Bi, an aspiring singer.

On September 24, 2009, she was announced to feature on MC Mong's repackaged album "Horror Show" in the song "나는..." ("I Am..."). The song was released on October 26, 2009 with a promotional video on the same day.

2009: Comeback 

After having her comeback further delayed by problems with her management company, Ivy released her third album "I Be..", with contributions from artists such as PSY and Nam Gyuri. She also switched from Fantom Entertainment to De Chocolate E&TF.

The first song released was "눈물아 안녕" ("Goodbye Tears"), along with a promotional video. The song reached No. 1 on various online charts. However, her title song was chosen to be "Touch Me", a techno dance track written by PSY. The music video was released on October 23, 2009. However, it was banned from broadcast three days later for being too inappropriate for viewing of minors with its sexual references.

Ivy also stars in her own 13-episode reality show on M.net called "IVY BACK", the first episode airing on October 27, 2009. After performing a special showcase for her new album, Ivy officially made her comeback debut with "Touch Me" on SBS's Inkigayo on November 1, 2009.

Due to problems between Ivy's ex-management company and MBC and KBS, she is unable to perform on weekly music shows such as "Music Core" and "Music Bank". Instead, she is only allowed to promote on M.net's M!Countdown. However, she was later given approval to perform and appear on SBS programs.

On December 13, 2009, Ivy returned for the second time on Inkigayo since her comeback with "Goodbye Tears". Promotions for her third album ended on January 24, 2010.

On January 10, 2010, Ivy's social security number was leaked onto the internet after an article reporting about an episode of IVY BACK failed to censor it out in a photo of Ivy holding her documents. Her company has stated they will take legal action against the netizens who have hacked into Ivy's personal accounts.

2012–present: Comeback 

On March 27, 2012, Ivy released a mini album titled Interview which featured five ballad-type songs. The song "찢긴 가슴"("Broken Heart"), which was released with a music video, was chosen as the lead single. It debuted on the Mnet Pop singles chart at 18.

In 2013, Ivy made her comeback with the lead single of her new album titled "I Dance" featuring Yubin of the Wonder Girls.

In 2022, Ivy will hold a two-day solo concert 'NEXT PAGE' at Nodeul Island Live House in Yongsan-gu, Seoul on August 13 and 14.

Discography

Studio albums

Extended plays

Singles

Soundtrack appearances

Compilation appearances

Filmography

Musical theater

Awards

References 

1982 births
K-pop singers
Living people
South Korean musical theatre actresses
South Korean female idols
South Korean women pop singers
MAMA Award winners
Singers from Seoul
21st-century South Korean singers
21st-century South Korean women singers